Jeff Schiebler (born June 1, 1973 in New Westminster, British Columbia) is a track and field athlete from Canada, who competes in the middle distance and long-distance running events. He represented his native country at two consecutive Summer Olympics, in 1996 and 2000.

A five-time national champion in the men's 5,000 metres, Schiebler won the bronze medal in the same event at the 1999 Pan American Games in Winnipeg. He still holds the Canadian High School Record of 14:35.06 set in 1990.

See also
 Canadian records in track and field

References
 Canadian Olympic Committee
 Marathon Debut

External links

1973 births
Living people
Canadian male long-distance runners
Canadian male middle-distance runners
Athletes (track and field) at the 1996 Summer Olympics
Athletes (track and field) at the 2000 Summer Olympics
Athletes (track and field) at the 1999 Pan American Games
Athletes (track and field) at the 1994 Commonwealth Games
Athletes (track and field) at the 1998 Commonwealth Games
Athletes (track and field) at the 2002 Commonwealth Games
Olympic track and field athletes of Canada
Sportspeople from British Columbia
Pan American Games bronze medalists for Canada
Pan American Games medalists in athletics (track and field)
Medalists at the 1999 Pan American Games
Commonwealth Games competitors for Canada